is a fictional character in the manga Yu-Gi-Oh! by Kazuki Takahashi. As the majority shareholder and CEO of his own multi-national gaming company, Kaiba Corporation, Kaiba is reputed to be Japan's greatest gamer and aims to become the world's greatest player of the American card game, Duel Monsters (Magic & Wizards in the Japanese manga). In all mediums, his arch-rival is the protagonist of the series, Yugi Mutou, who is also a superb game player. He is the modern day reincarnation of one of the Pharaoh's Six High Priests, "Priest Seto", who appears in the manga's final arc. Kaiba has also appeared in related anime works and feature films.

Seto Kaiba originates from one of the stories Takahashi heard from a friend involving a selfish card collector. Like the card collector, Kaiba is obsessed with gaming, but Takahashi also gave Kaiba a calmer demeanor when developing his relationship with his rival. He was first voiced by Hikaru Midorikawa in Japanese with Kenjirō Tsuda replacing him in the sequel Duel Monsters. Eric Stuart voiced him in all of his English appearances.

Critical reception to Kaiba has been mixed for being compared to simplistic anime rivals based on his multiple attempts to defeat Yugi and become the superior Duel Monsters player. While his development in the film Dark Side of Dimensions was praised for being the major focus in the narrative, critics still felt Kaiba was obsessed with Duel Monsters to a ridiculous extent based on his continued focus on his original goal.

Creation and development

Seto Kaiba originates from Kazuki Takahashi's stories he was told by a friend. According to the story, there was a real life person who played trading cards but was unwilling to play with him because he was not an expert. Displeased with hearing about this person, Takahashi decided to use this cardgame collector as a manga character, resulting in Kaiba's creation. In the making of the series, Takahashi wanted to create an appealing creature for his Duel Monster fight with Yugi Mutou. Named the "Blue-Eyes White Dragon", he wanted it "to evoke a feeling that would allow readers to conjure up its colors". This later led to the creation of Kisara for the series' final arc where her origins are connected with Kaiba.
Takahashi believes modern society focuses too much on winners and losers. For example, the author believes the regular Yugi and Katsuya Jonouchi (known as Joey Wheeler in the English anime) to have more potential as characters because they only focus on enjoying games. He felt Yami Yugi and Kaiba are weaker characters despite the former's heroic traits. As a result, he believes Dark Yugi is at his best when he is being supported by the rest of the cast. 

According to Takahashi, while Yugi and Kaiba are rivals, they are not close friends. He believes, however, the most important part of their relationship is before Yugi's duel against Marik's alter-ego. Before the game begins, Kaiba passes Yugi a card that could help him in the game. This scene felt like one of the most difficult scenes to write because of the pair's rivalry. Takahashi views Kaiba as Yugi's archnemesis and thus consider Yugi a highly important character because without him, Kaiba would not have a reason to exist.

In the second Japanese anime adaptation of the Yu-Gi-Oh series, Kaiba is voiced by Kenjiro Tsuda. Tsuda expressed a dislike towards his character as he would not befriend him as according to him "I definitely don't want to become friends with him. I don't think anyone really does," he said while laughing. He also added that if he ever met Kaiba he would say "Glad to see you're doing well" and "I'm always in your care." Nevertheless, he regarded Kaiba as both as a "strong" and "unique" character on his own.

English voice actor Eric Stuart felt he connected to Kaiba. He noted that most fans tend to view him as a villain but he instead views him as a rival as, according to Stuart, Kaiba's role is to strengthen Yugi's skills. However, he noted that for the film Dark Side of Dimensions, Kaiba has changed ever since his introduction due to his obsession with power, thus making Stuart wanted to give him an edge in his personality. Nevertheless, he views Kaiba's characterization consistent.

Appearances

In the Yu-Gi-Oh! manga
In his introduction, Kaiba discovers that the grandfather of his classmate, Yugi Mutou, owns the rare Blue-Eyes White Dragon card. Dark Yugi emerges from within Yugi's Millennium Puzzle to challenge Kaiba a Shadow Game to reclaim it.  Kaiba is defeated, suffering Dark Yugi's Penalty Game: .  Kaiba plots a revenge. He acquires the other three Blue-Eyes White Dragon cards in existence through extortion and blackmail and builds "Death T," a "theme park" made up of many deadly games designed to end the lives of Yugi and his friends. He defeats Sugoroku and tears up his Blue-Eyes White Dragon and subjects him to an artificial Penalty Game that mimicked his own, forcing Yugi to participate in Death-T or else he will kill his grandfather. Yugi once again defeats him and uses the power of his Millennium Puzzle to subject Kaiba to a Penalty Game, leaving him in a coma.  

After Kaiba wakes up from his coma, he gets wind of Pegasus' plans and his kidnap of Mokuba, and travels to Duelist Kingdom. Kaiba regains his deck and briefly battles Jonouchi. Kaiba and Yugi later play the game atop the castle parapets. Kaiba is once again on the cusp of defeat, until he places his own life on danger by balancing on the edge of the turret, forcing Yugi into a moral corner. Dark Yugi nearly kills Kaiba, but Yugi forces him to forfeit the game in fear of killing his opponent. Kaiba goes on to duel Pegasus, but is overcome by the power of his Millennium Eye and is defeated. Pegasus gives Seto Kaiba the Mind Card Penalty Game, sealing his soul into a card, but when Dark Yugi defeats Pegasus in a Shadow Game during the final round of the tournament, the Kaiba brothers are both freed from their Penalty Games. 

In the Battle City arc, Kaiba is summoned to the Domino City museum by Egyptologist Ishizu Ishtar, Kaiba is shown the ancient stone tablet that depicts a battle between what appears to be his past self and the Pharaoh. He is interested in her tale of the God Cards – three powerful one-of-a-kind cards that Pegasus had entrusted to her. Two, however, were already stolen by her brother Marik and his Ghouls organization, and she gives the third – God of Obelisk – to Kaiba, encouraging him to hold a tournament of his own to lure in Marik and his organization of the gaming underworld, who he views as counterfeiting scum that deserve to be crushed. Seeking to obtain the remaining two God Cards for himself and eliminating the organization of bootleggers, Kaiba agrees, and begins his "Battle City" competition. During the tournament, Kaiba teams up with Dark Yugi to rescue Mokuba and Yugi's friends from the clutches of Marik and his deadly games. Afterward, Yugi, Kaiba and Jonouchi enter the finals, unaware that Marik has made a deal with Dark Bakura, and he, along with Marik and Marik's stepbrother Rishid, are registered as well. Kaiba trumps Ishizu's prophecy of defeat and claims victory. Kaiba faces Yugi in the semifinals, and the two unleash their God Cards against the other. Yugi manages to defeat Kaiba and go on to the final battle against Dark Marik. Kaiba gives Yugi the card Fiend Sanctuary prior to the duel, and with it, Yugi is able to hold off the attacks of Dark Marik's Sun Dragon Ra and defeat him in his Shadow Game.

Anime arcs
Shortly after his return from the Duelist Kingdom, the Big Five attempt to appease an outraged Kaiba by revealing that they have finalized his virtual reality game software, and invite him to test it out for himself. However, this was another attempt to do away with Kaiba, but Yugi and his friends manage to rescue him. The Big Five log into the virtual world in an attempt to stop them from escaping, but they are defeated in a duel, and their own minds became trapped in the virtual reality program. Some time later, in the midst of the Battle City tournament, the Big Five's digital consciousnesses are discovered stranded in cyberspace by a mysterious boy named Noah, who recruits them for a revenge campaign against Kaiba. Noah admits to being Gozaburo Kaiba's biological son, and claims his mind exists as a computer program after he was fatally wounded as a child and later digitized. After Noah is defeated, Gozaburo reveals himself as alive and inside the Virtual World, and sets a series of orbital missiles to launch and destroy the world. While Kaiba stops Gozaburo, a reformed Noah reprograms one of the satellites to attack the main computer database and helps Yugi and his friends escape. 

In Season 4 of the anime, Kaiba, along with Jonouchi and Yugi, is one of three duelists chosen to fight the Atlantean King Dartz. During the season, Kaiba meets Amelda, an orphan whose brother and parents were killed by KaibaCorp-owned military forces under Gozaburo Kaiba's command. Due to his love for his brother, Kaiba becomes sympathetic to Amelda and carries his soul-less body to safety after their duel. Kaiba and Dark Yugi eventually duel Dartz, and although Kaiba loses, Dark Yugi defeats Dartz and Kaiba is restored, taking part in the battle against the Great Leviathan.

In the first half of season 5, KaibaCorp's stock prices are at an all-time low as a result of a failed takeover by Dartz, and when Kaiba hosts a tournament to restore the company's reputation, Zigfried von Schroeder infiltrates it and hacks Kaiba's computer systems. Catching Zigfried, Kaiba dispatches him a duel. However, Zigfried has his brother Leon duel Yugi in the finals. During the duel, Zigfried tricks Leon into activating Golden Castle of Stromberg, releasing a computer virus into Kaiba's system and forcing Leon to attack and thus forcing his hand. However, Yugi prevails while Kaiba, who anticipating such a plan, has already had his computer systems backed up.

Seto Kaiba's only appearance in the original manga version of the Millennium World arc is in the last chapter. Although Seto Kaiba does not take part in the Shadow RPG during the Millennium World arc of the manga, in the anime, Dark Bakura gives him the Millennium Eye, which begins to show Kaiba visions and convinces him to fly to Egypt to determine if they are real or not. During the final battle, he is able to hold his ground against Zorc. In the original Japanese anime, Kaiba eventually does acknowledge his past and the events that occurred in the Memory World Shadow RPG.

Yu-Gi-Oh! (1999 film)
Seto Kaiba is the main antagonist of the Yu-Gi-Oh! movie, which was produced by Toei Animation in 1999. In this film, Kaiba, learns about Shougo Aoyama's Red-Eyes Black Dragon, organizes a tournament where strong duelists are invited - and attendance is mandatory. Shougo and Yugi Muto are later chased down and roughed up by Kaiba's henchmen from KaibaCorp, with Kaiba's henchmen overpowering both of them and stealing Yugi's Millennium Puzzle. Now Yugi must enter Kaiba's tournament and show Shougo that one can have both the potential and the power to become a true Duelist.  After the game, Kaiba tells Yugi that their battle is not over yet, informing Yugi that he is the only one in the world worth fighting as he leaves the arena.

Yu-Gi-Oh! The Movie: The Pyramid of Light
Kaiba makes an appearance in Yu-Gi-Oh! The Movie: The Pyramid of Light. In the wake of his defeat at the Battle City Tournament, Seto began to suggest a means of defeating the three Egyptian God Cards that Yugi now holds, in order to defeat him and reclaim his title as world champion. His quest led him to Pegasus, theorizing that Pegasus would not have created the Egyptian God Cards without creating some means of destroying them. Wagering his three Blue-Eyes White Dragons against the card that Pegasus promised him, Kaiba succeeded in winning their duel, only to find two cards within Pegasus's deck that could accomplish what he sought. Kaiba challenges Yugi to yet another duel in his Duel Dome, and put the first of the two cards into play – the enigmatic "Pyramid of Light," which prevented the Egyptian God Cards from participating in the battle. As the duel proceeded, however, it was revealed that Kaiba had been used as a puppet for the ancient Egyptian sorcerer, Anubis, who had placed the Pyramid of Light card in Pegasus's deck. The Pyramid's powers were draining the lifeforces of Yugi and Kaiba as the duel progressed, eventually resurrecting Anubis, who dispatched Kaiba and took his place in the duel. With Kaiba's aid, however, Yugi put the second mighty card into play – the Blue-Eyes Shining Dragon, able to destroy any card in play. The Shining Dragon destroyed the Pyramid of Light, and later wiped out Anubis.

Yu-Gi-Oh Dark Side of Dimensions
Kaiba has commissioned an excavation to retrieve the disassembled Millennium Puzzle from the ruins of the Millennium chamber. The item had previously housed the spirit of his longtime rival, Pharaoh Atem, whom he hopes to "return to life" in order to settle their ancient score. The excavation is interrupted by Diva, who faces Kaiba in a game of Duel Monsters and steals two pieces of the recovered Puzzle. He keeps one fragment and gives the other to his younger sister Sera, who passes it on to Yugi Muto, as he is the only one who can reassemble the Puzzle, being host of the Nameless Pharaoh. Kaiba has a computer that rebuilds the Millennium Puzzle and discovers the last two pieces are missing. He abducts Diva and approaches Yugi, so he can have the two take part in the showcasing of his updated Duel Disk virtual reality technology. He intends to duel both Diva and Yugi, while gambling their pieces of the puzzle. However, Yugi is furious with Diva over what he did to Bakura and insists he duel him instead, which Kaiba agrees to. Yugi defeats Diva, resulting in Bakura's return to reality, and while dueling Kaiba, Yugi re-completes the Millennium Puzzle to demonstrate that the spirit of Atem is no longer inside it. Diva becomes corrupted by the incredible evil powers of the Millennium Ring, and duels both Yugi and Kaiba. Kaiba sacrifices himself during the Duel and makes a final plea for Yugi to call forth Atem. Yugi succeeds in doing so, and he and Atem defeat Diva with ease. Atem and the Millennium Puzzle then fade away, and Kaiba and everyone else return to reality. The film concludes with Kaiba using his technology in conjunction with the Quantum Cube to transport his own consciousness to the Afterlife and face Atem.

Appearances in other media
Though not seen much in the Yu-Gi-Oh! GX series. Kaiba is referred as the one who owns and started Duel Academy (Duel Academia) and named the dormitories personally. He has made several appearances, the first being when he makes a bet on his ownership of the school. Another few times were in flashbacks, once where Jaden remembers a competition he entered that was held by the KaibaCorp and another when a reporter sneaks into Duel Academy. The Duel Spirit Kaibaman also appears. Kaiba's only appearance in person comes when Sartorius visits him to request the use of his Kaiba Land amusement park. Kaiba has not made any other appearance since, though it has been shown that he is the only surviving citizen of Trueman's invasion in Domino City. The Kaiba Dome is seen often in Yu-Gi-Oh! 5D's. His company Kaiba Corp is responsible for turning Domino City into New Domino City. 

Kaiba also appears in some of the Yu-Gi-Oh! video games as an opponent which the player can duel (or play as) as well as the crossover Jump Force.

Reception

Critical reception to Kaiba has been mixed. DVD Talk describes Kaiba as an unlikely ally to Yugi but saw his defeat in the third story arc as predictable. For the fourth season, the reviewer described Kaiba as one of the last heroes. Dan Green and Eric Stuart's voice talents were praised though their deliveries were subject of negative response. THEM Anime Reviews criticized him while comparing him with another stereotypical rival, Dragon Ball character Vegeta as both possess simplistic characterizations due to how much they are obsessed with the leads. Anime News Network described him as a stereotypical manga rival while pointing out his actions in order to be the best Duel Monster gamer. Although ANN mocked the multiple duels between Kaiba and Yugi, ANN praised the balance between their cards as done by Kazuki Takahashi. Manga News described him as too cold-hearted a character in the manga's initial chapter. However, the writer noted that he changes in the narrative after being defeated by Yugi and briefly sent into a coma. Chris Homer from The Fandom Post praised Kaiba's actions in the final arc as he joins Yami Yugi in his fight against Bakura and Zorc in Ancient Egypt while dealing with the life of his predecessor, "Priest Seto".

The duels between Kaiba's and Yugi's in Pyramid of Light were made fun of by DVD Talk for sounding as obvious strategy of producing more trading cards to be bought by the audience. While reviewing Dark Side of Dimensions, IGN praised Yugi's growth alongside his friends' as they interact, making them more mature than in the manga and anime. IGN, however, wrote that although Yugi appears to be the movie's main character, he is overshadowed by Kaiba. Anime News Network labelled him as "still everyone's favorite egoistic lunatic" as there was no progress in regards to his lack of character arc. The Fandom Post criticized the obsessive relationship between Kaiba and the Pharaoh, which came across as romantic in fanfic-like stories. Green's performance as the holographic Pharaoh was praised and the regular Yugi's rivalry with Kaiba received a positive response. Richard Eisenbeis from Kotaku reviewed the movie favorably, finding Kaiba as the most important character in the plot, ridiculizing his personality for his overthetop actions to face the late Yami Yugi as he does not see Yugi Muto as a worthy opponent. Nevertheless, he finds that thanks to Kaiba the movie is able to deliver a more interesting narrative, finding the new characters lacking in appeal. Anime UK News found Kaiba's actions inconsistent but still praised the deliveries of his Japanese voice actor, Kenjiro Tsuda, which he described as "overdramatic echoing". Though also commented as the film's lead, Atomix found Kaiba's obsession to face Yami Yugi exaggerated to the point of being judged as unhealthy and lamented the narrative did not focus in other prominent members from the cast. Blu Ray panned Kaiba's characterization for his actions in regards to a rematch with Yami as being repetitive in the franchise due to how many times this scenario was played and how the staff member decided to keep focusing on the card game aspect of the series rather than how older the cast member has become instead.

References

 Kazuki Takahashi (2002). Yu-Gi-Oh! Characters Guide Book – The Gospel of Truth (遊☆戯☆王キャラクターズガイドブック―真理の福音―). Shueisha. 

Adoptee characters in anime and manga
Comics characters introduced in 1996
Fictional businesspeople
Fictional business executives
Fictional gamblers
Fictional high school students
Fictional Japanese people in anime and manga
Male characters in anime and manga
Orphan characters in anime and manga
Teenage characters in anime and manga
Teenage characters in film
Yu-Gi-Oh! characters